Raghuvinder Shokeen  is an Indian politician and is member of the Sixth Legislative Assembly of Delhi. He is a member of the Aam Aadmi Party and represents Nangloi Jat (Assembly constituency) of Delhi.

Early life and education
He is a graduate in engineering (1983–88) from NIT (erstwhile REC) Kurukshetra. He used to be active in politics during college days.

Political career

Posts held

See also

Sixth Legislative Assembly of Delhi
Delhi Legislative Assembly
Government of India
Politics of India
Aam Aadmi Party

Electoral performance

References 
 

Living people
People from New Delhi
Delhi MLAs 2015–2020
Delhi MLAs 2020–2025
Aam Aadmi Party politicians from Delhi
Year of birth missing (living people)